Last Gasp is a San Francisco-based book publisher with a lowbrow art and counterculture focus. Owned and operated by Ron Turner, for most of its existence Last Gasp was a publisher, distributor, and wholesaler of underground comix and books of all types.

Last Gasp was established in 1970. Although the company came onto the scene a bit later than some of the other underground publishers, Last Gasp continued publishing comix far longer most of its competitors. In addition to publishing notable original titles like Slow Death, Wimmen's Comix, Binky Brown Meets the Holy Virgin Mary, and Weirdo, it also picked up the publishing reins of important titles — such as Zap Comix and Young Lust  — from rivals who had gone out of business.

Last Gasp no longer publishes "floppy" comics; the company publishes art and photography books, graphic novels, fiction, and poetry, producing 10–15 new titles per year.

History 

Last Gasp Eco Funnies was founded in Berkeley, California, in 1970 by San Francisco State University graduate student Ronald E. Turner, with the help of Gary Arlington, to publish the ecologically-themed comics title Slow Death Funnies (in conjunction with the first Earth Day). Last Gasp followed Slow Death Funnies with the all-female anthology It Ain't Me, Babe, spearheaded by Trina Robbins.

Last Gasp incorporated on September 11, 1971. In the time period 1971–1973, Last Gasp published Air Pirates Funnies #1–2 and a number of other Air Pirates-related titles, including The Tortoise and the Hare, Dopin' Dan #1–3, and Merton of the Movement. (Turner insists that he only served as an advisor to the Air Pirates collective, despite them crediting his company as "publisher.") Considered to be an "enabler" of the Air Pirates infamous Walt Disney parodies, Turner's name was added to Disney's lawsuit against the collective. Turner quickly settled with Disney, but Air Pirates Dan O'Neill, Bobby London, and Ted Richards continued fighting, in a case that dragged on for years.

The company's success with Slow Death and It Ain't Me, Babe enabled Last Gasp to expand into distribution, in addition to publishing. The company soon became a major part of the underground comix movement. Sociopolitical themes were explored in Last Gasp series such as Guy Colwell's Inner City Romance (1972–1979), which portrayed gritty urban tales;   Armageddon (1973), which focused on anarcho-capitalism; and Anarchy Comics (1978), which focused on left-wing politics. In addition to publishing Wimmen's Comix for much of its run, Last Gasp published a number of other comix with feminist themes, including  It Ain't Me, Babe, Tits & Clits Comix, Twisted Sisters #1, and Good Girls.

In 1972, Last Gasp published Justin Green's seminal autobiographical comic Binky Brown Meets the Holy Virgin Mary.

Beginning in 1972, Last Gasp began publishing ongoing titles moving over from other companies; beginning with Young Lust, and then Rand Holmes' Harold Hedd.  In 1977, the company picked up Joyce Farmer and Lyn Chevely's Tits & Clits Comix, publishing that series until 1987. Last Gasp published the final three issues of San Francisco Comic Book in 1980–1983, and the latter half of Zap Comix''' run from 1982 to 2005.

Last Gasp also published Weirdo from 1981 to 1993, and Cherry Poptart from 1982 to 1992.

In the early 1980s Last Gasp published some of the first books about the West Coast punk rock scene, including a number of titles by Peter Belsito.

Last Gasp moved its headquarters from Berkeley to San Francisco in c. 1975. Starting in 1975, Ron Turner began hosting the annual "Burritos, Beer & Cheer" holiday party at the Last Gasp offices, which was also a fundraiser for the Martin de Porres House of Hospitality, a free soup kitchen located in San Francisco. Last Gasp hosted "Burritos, Beer & Cheer" for more than 30 years.

In the period 2004–2010, Last Gasp published English-language compilations of popular manga titles, including Fumiyo Kouno's Town of Evening Calm, Country of Cherry Blossoms; Junko Mizuno's Pure Trance; and Keiji Nakazawa's Barefoot Gen.

In early December 2016, Last Gasp announced it was ending its comics distribution business to focus solely on book publishing. (As one of the last independent distributors, they handled comics distribution from more than 100 small comics publishers.) As a consequence, the company planned to lay off the bulk of its dozen employees by February 2017.

 Creators associated with Last Gasp 
Notable artists published by Last Gasp include Tim Biskup, Robert Crumb, Richard Corben, Ron English, Camille Rose Garcia, Justin Green, Bill Griffith, John Howard, Greg Irons, Shawna Kenney, Spain Rodriguez, Mark Ryden, Dori Seda, Larry Welz, Robert Williams, and S. Clay Wilson.

 Titles published (selected) 
Comix 

 Manga translations 
 Kouno, Fumiyo. Town of Evening Calm, Country of Cherry Blossoms (2004)
 Mizuno, Junko. Pure Trance (2005)
 Nakazawa, Keiji. Barefoot Gen (10 issues, 2004–2010)

 Books 
 Belsito, Peter, Bob Davis, and Marian Kester. StreetArt: The Punk Poster in San Francisco 1977-1981 (1981) 
 Belsito, Peter and Bob Davis. Hardcore California: A History of Punk and New Wave (1983) 
 Belsito, Peter. Notes From the Pop Underground (1985) 
 Blank, Joani (ed.) Femalia (2nd ed., 2011)
 Cometbus. Despite Everything: A Cometbus Omnibus (2002) 
 Corinne, Tee. The Cunt Coloring Book (1989)
 Davis, Mike. A Blind Man's Journey (2014) 
 Griffith, Bill. Zippy Stories (1986). 
 Fitzgerald, F. Stop and Marian Kester. Dead Kennedys: The Unauthorized Version (1983) 
 LeRoy, J. T. with illustrations by Cherry Hood. Labour (2006) 
 Perry, Michael with illustrations by Doug Cunningham. Turntable Timmy (paperback re-issue, 2015)
 Schorr, Todd. American Surreal'' (2008)

See also

List of book distributors

References

External links
 
 

  Photos from the 2005 charity fundraising party held at Last Gasp offices
 Photos from the 2007 charity fundraising party held at Last Gasp offices
 Photos from the 2008 charity fundraising party held at Last Gasp offices

 
Comic book publishing companies of the United States
Companies based in San Francisco
Underground comix
Publishing companies established in 1970
Publishers of adult comics
1970 establishments in California
Book distributors